Norderney may refer to:
Norderney, one of the East Frisian islands
 Norderney,a municipality in the district of Aurich in Lower Saxony.
Lager Norderney, a Nazi prison camp, on Alderney
MV Norderney, a radio ship used by Radio Veronica